Minerva between Geometry and Arithmetic is a 1550 fresco fragment, usually attributed to Paolo Veronese but by some art historians to Anselmo Canera or Giambattista Zelotti. It was painted for the Palazzo de Soranzi in Castelfranco Veneto but now in the Palazzo Balbi in Venice.

The decorative scheme at the Palazzo de Soranzi was designed by Michele Sanmicheli for the Venetian patrician Piero Soranzo. He took on young painters from Verona to paint the frescoes in the four side-rooms, the main hall and the atrium – these included Giovanni Battista Zelotti, Anselmo Canera and Bernardino India, as well as Veronese. The numbers on Arithmetic's abacus may refer to those hidden by her hand (i.e. 1+2+5+6+9), the latter totalling 23, argued by some to symbolise either Veronese's age at the time or the year of Piero Soranzo and Francesca Emo's marriage, 1523. Others argue that the visible numbers on the abacus (3+4+7+8+10, totalling 32) refer to the length of Soranzo and Emo's had been married at the time they built the palazzo (i.e. 1550).

The Palazzo was completely demolished in 1817 on the orders of Francesco Maria Barbaro, its last owner. At the instigation of Giovanni (John) Vendramini from Bassano, the painter, chemist and mechanic Filippo Balbi removed some of the frescoes from the walls using a new technique and sold most of them to Vendramini himself, who was a London art dealer, lithographer and heir to his Portuguese father-in-law's fortune. Other fragments were donated to Castelfranco Veneto's cathedral and the Venice Seminary and sold to private collectors. An 1817 letter by Padre Barisan refers to 156 fragments being saved, though British and Italian newspapers of the time instead suggest 108, of which more than 60 went to London.

With several others from the Palazzo de Soranzi, the fragment showing Minerva appeared  in a Maddox Street Galleries catalogue of 1826 as "Minerva between Mensuration and Calculation". The following year Vendramini produced a print of it entitled THE BELLONA. From The FRESCO PAINTING BY PAUL VERONESE. One of the Series removed from the Walls of the Soranza Palace, and brought to England by M. Vendramini. The Regione Veneto acquired the fragment on the art market in 2002 after being sold three times in the previous hundred years

Bibliography
 Exhibition of Paintings in Fresco, by Paul Veronese. Brought from The Soranza Palace, in the Venetian Territory, Now on View, At The Gallery, Maddox-Street, Hanover-Square, Opposite St. Georges Church. London: Printed by Thomas Pavison, Whitefriars. 1826
 Angelo Miatello, "The Bellona. From Painting by Paul Veronse", Castelfranco Veneto, 2014, pp. 133
  Gisolfi D., “I rapporti di Paolo con l'ambiente artistico veronese negli anni della Soranza”, ibid., p. 94 ss.;
  Gisolfi Pechukas D., “Veronese and his collaborators, at la Soranza”, Artibus et Historiae, 15, 1987, pp. 67–108:
  AA. VV., Veronese, Miti, ritratti, allegorie, Pedrocco F., Opere, Milano, 2005, p. 55 ss.
  AA.VV., La città di Padova, Roma, 1970
  AA.VV., La pittura nel Veneto. Il Cinquecento, tomo secondo, Regione del Veneto, Electa, 1998: - Humfrey P., Venezia 1540-1600
  Elisabetta Saccomanni, Padova 1540-1570; - Giorgio Fossaluzza G., Treviso 1540-1600
  Margaret Binotto, Vicenza 1540-1660; - Sergio Marinelli, Verona 1540-1600
  Antonio Romagnolo, Il Polesine di Rovigo 1540-1600
  Albertolli F., Porte di città e altre fabbriche di M. Sammicheli, Milano, 1815
  Atti della distribuzione de' Premi d'Industria nel giorno 12 Febbraio 1817... con discorso analogo di S.E. il conte di Goess, Venezia 1817, pp. 24–25
  Bordignon Favero G., Castelfranco Veneto e il suo territorio nella storia e nell'arte, Castelfranco Veneto, 1975, vol. I-II
  Bordignon Favero G., I Palazzi Soranzo Novello e Spinelli Guidozzi in Castelfranco Veneto, Castelfranco, 1981
  Bordignon Favero G., Le Opere d'arte e il Tesoro del Duomo di S. Maria e S. Liberale di Castelfranco Veneto, Castelfranco, 1965
  Cecchetto G., Castelfranco Veneto.Città di Giorgione. Guida, 2008
  Cerinotti A., Atlante illustrato dei Miti greci e Roma antica, Firenze, 2003
  Chiuppani G., “Gli incisori fratelli Vendramini”, in Bollettino del Museo Civico di Bassano, 6, 1909, pp. 56–70, 108-116
  Cicogna E. A., Delle Inscrizioni Veneziane, Volume 3, Editore Orlandelli, 1830; Pag.19)
  Crico L., Lettere sulle belle arti trevigiane, Treviso, 1883
  Il contadino istruito dal suo parroco, Treviso, 1830
  Davies P. and Hemsoll D., Michele Sanmicheli, Milano, 2004, p. 173
  Hemsoll D., “Le ville di Sanmicheli”, in AA.VV., Michele Sanmicheli, Architettura, linguaggio e cultura artistica nel Cinquecento, CISA 1995, p. 92 ss.
  Lodi S., Napione E., “Per Paolo spezapreda”, ibid., p. 86 ss.
  Malvestio C. Miatello A., L'Egitto visto dai Veneti. Il nuovo corso del dopo Mubarak, Castelfranco, 2011
  Sparisi G., Miatello A., Malvestio C., L'Orto Botanico di Padova, Castelfranco V.to, 2012
  Spiazzi A. M., “Un affresco di Paolo Veronese dalla Soranza”, in Arte Veneta, n. 60, 2003, p. 228-233
  Squizzato L., “Nuove documentazioni intorno alla Soranza”, p. 13-20, in Dal Pozzolo E. M., Cecchetto G. (ed.s), Veronese nelle terre di Giorgione, Venezia, 2014
  Cecchetto G., “La Soranza storia di una vita”, 2014, p. 21 ss.
  Stocco, “Il Castello di Treville…”, Ateneo Veneto, 1910, p. 256-8
  Pignatti P., Da Tiziano a El Greco. Per la storia del Manierismo a Venezia, 1981, catalogo della mostra, Milano, 1981, pp. 181–183
  Trevisan F., Omaggio di riconoscenza al nobile signore Filippo Balbi per alcune pitture a fresco di Paolo Caliari trasportate dai muri in tela e donate alla chiesa di San Liberale. Alvisopoli, 1819
  Vasari G., Le vite de' più eccellenti Pittori, Scultori ed Architetti, 1568, ed. 1943, vol. III, pp. 125–126, 359, 369
  Vasari G., Le vite dei più eccellenti pittori, scultori e architetti (Vita di Michele Sanmicheli), Firenze, 1568
  Vignola F.N., “Appunti sulla Pinacoteca Vicentina. Un affresco della Villa Soranza”, in Bollettino del Museo Civico di Vicenza, 1, 1910, fasc. 2, pp. Il-18; *  Zamperini A., Veronese, Milano, 2013
  Zorzi A., La vita quotidiana a Venezia nel secolo del Tiziano, Milano, 1994
  Zorzi A., Una città, una Repubblica un Impero, Milano, 1994.

References

Mythological paintings by Paolo Veronese
Fresco paintings in Veneto
1550 paintings
16th-century allegorical paintings
Allegorical paintings by Italian artists
Paintings of Minerva